Amirhossein Esfandiar (born 24 January 1999) is an Iranian professional volleyball player. He is part of the Iranian national team, and a two–time Asian Champion (2019, 2021). At the professional club level, he plays for Ural Ufa.

Sporting achievements

Clubs
 National championships
 2020/2021  Belgian Championship, with Greenyard Maaseik

Youth national team
 2014  AVC U18 Asian Championship
 2016  AVC U20 Asian Championship
 2017  FIVB U19 World Championship
 2018  AVC U20 Asian Championship
 2019  FIVB U21 World Championship

Individual awards
 2014: AVC U18 Asian Championship – Best Outside Spiker
 2016: AVC U20 Asian Championship – Best Outside Spiker
 2017: FIVB U19 World Championship – Most Valuable Player
 2017: FIVB U19 World Championship – Best Outside Spiker 
 2018: AVC U20 Asian Championship – Most Valuable Player
 2019: FIVB U21 World Championship – Most Valuable Player

References

External links
 
 Player profile at Volleybox.net

1999 births
Living people
People from Amol
Sportspeople from Mazandaran province
Iranian men's volleyball players
Iranian expatriate sportspeople in Belgium
Expatriate volleyball players in Belgium
Iranian expatriate sportspeople in Russia
Expatriate volleyball players in Russia
Ural Ufa volleyball players
Outside hitters
Islamic Solidarity Games competitors for Iran
21st-century Iranian people